KSH or ksh may refer to:

Kenyan shilling, the currency of Kenya
KornShell, a Unix shell developed by David Korn in the early 1980s
Kölsch language (ISO 639-3 language code), a Ripuarian dialect spoken in Germany
, the  Hungarian Central Statistical Office
Shahid Ashrafi Esfahani Airport (IATA airport code), in Kermanshah, Iran
Kerrville State Hospital, a mental hospital in Kerrville, Texas
Potassium hydrosulfide, chemical formula KSH